Diego Botín Sanz de Sautuola Le Chever (born 25 December 1993) is a Spanish sailor. He and Iago López placed ninth in the 49er event at the 2016 Summer Olympics.

Notes

References

External links
 
 
 
 

1993 births
Living people
Spanish male sailors (sport)
Olympic sailors of Spain
Sailors at the 2016 Summer Olympics – 49er
Sailors at the 2020 Summer Olympics – 49er
21st-century Spanish people
People from Santander, Spain
Sportspeople from Cantabria
Sportspeople from Madrid